Myanmar Aerospace Engineering University (abbreviated MAEU) is a specialized public university of aerospace engineering, located in Meiktila, Myanmar. The university offers undergraduate diploma, bachelor's degree and post-graduate diploma programs in several aerospace engineering specializations and technologies.

History
Prior to MAEU's founding in 2002, Yangon Technological University was the only institution in Myanmar that offered studies in aerospace engineering. YTU began a Bachelor of Engineering degree program in Aeronautical Engineering in 1991, and in 1997 upgraded the program to Aerospace Engineering, ostensibly to "study the space technology and application". In 2002, the military government established a specialized university for aerospace engineering in Meiktila, home of the central command of Myanmar Air Force, possibly with Russian and Chinese technical assistance.

On 14 February 2020, in the aftermath of the 2021 Myanmar coup d'état, 20 soldiers raided the MAEU campus, in relation to the campus faculty's and student body's participation in the ongoing civil disobedience movement.

Campus
The university is on a 45.5-hectare (112.5-acre) campus, located on the Yangon-Mandalay highway, next to the Ground Training Base of Myanmar Air Force.

Programs
MAEU offers six-year Bachelor of Engineering (BE) degree programs and one-year post-graduate diplomas in various specializations of aerospace engineering.

Bachelor's
 Propulsion and Flight Vehicles (စက်နှင့်ပျံသန်းယာဉ်)
 Avionics (လေကြောင်း အီလက်ထရောနစ် စနစ်)
 Electrical Systems and Instrumentation (လျှပ်စစ်နှင့်တိုင်းတာပစ္စည်း)
 Fuel and Propellant Engineering (လောင်စာနှင့်တွန်းကန်ပစ္စည်း)
 Space Systems Engineering (အာကာသစနစ် အင်ဂျင်နီယာ)

Post-graduate diploma
 Airport Management (Dip.A.M.)

Faculty

Main departments

 Department of Propulsion and Flight Vehicles
 Department of Avionics
 Department of Electrical System & Instrumentation
 Department of Fuel & Propellant Engineering
 Department of Space Systems Engineering

Supporting departments
 Department of Myanmar
 Department of English
 Department of Engineering Mathematics
 Department of Engineering Chemistry
 Department of Engineering Physics
 Department of Computer Science
 Department of Workshop Technology

Research departments
 Department of UAV Research (မောင်းသူမဲ့လေယာဉ်သုတေသနဌာန)

References

Universities and colleges in Meiktila
Universities and colleges in Mandalay Region
Technological universities in Myanmar
Universities and colleges in Myanmar
Educational institutions established in 2002
2002 establishments in Myanmar